The Stampeders (sometimes shortened to Stampeders) are a Canadian rock trio consisting of lead guitarist and vocalist Rich Dodson, bassist Ronnie King and drummer Kim Berly.

History 
Formed in Calgary, Alberta, in 1964 as the Rebounds.
they had five members: Rich Dodson, Len Roemer, Brendan Lyttle, Kim Berly, and Race Holiday. They renamed themselves The Stampeders in 1965 and Len Roemer was replaced with Ronnie King and Van Louis. In 1966, they relocated to Toronto and became a trio in 1968 when Lyttle, Louis, and Holiday left.

The Stampeders scored a hit in 1971 with "Sweet City Woman", which won Best Single at the Juno Awards, reached #1 on the RPM magazine charts,  and #8 in the U.S. Billboard Hot 100 chart.  Written by Dodson, the track stayed in the Billboard chart for 16 weeks and the disc sold a million by September 1971, and the R.I.A.A. granted gold disc status. The Stampeders also won Juno Awards for Best Group, Best Producer (Mel Shaw), and Best Composer (Dodson) that year.  The band signed with Polydor Records for US distribution.

By 1975 the band had toured extensively in the United States and appeared on television shows. In 1976 they had another Canadian hit with "Hit The Road Jack", featuring Wolfman Jack. In Canada they produced seven more hits.

Dodson left the group in 1977. Berly and King recruited new members for the LP Platinum (1977). Berly then departed, leaving King to bring in three new members for the LP Ballsy (1979), and the band broke up shortly thereafter. The hitmaking trio reunited at the Calgary Stampede in 1992. They released a new album in 1998 titled Sure Beats Working.

On November 21, 2011, The Stampeders received the Lifetime Achievement Award from SOCAN at the 2011 SOCAN Awards in Toronto.  In 2015 the band received SOCAN Classic Awards for their songs "Monday Morning" and "Wild Eyes."

They continue to tour Canada playing fairs, festivals, casinos, and theatres.

Discography

Albums

Singles

See also 

Music of Canada
:Category:Canadian rock music groups

References

External links 
The Stampeders – Official website
The Stampeders – Bio at CanadianBands.com
 Entry at thecanadianencyclopedia.ca
 Stampeders at Discogs
 

Musical groups established in 1964
Musical groups disestablished in 1977
Musical groups reestablished in 1992
Musical groups from Calgary
Canadian rock music groups
Bell Records artists
Juno Award winners
1964 establishments in Alberta
1977 disestablishments in Canada
1992 establishments in Alberta